The 1914 North Galway by-election was held on 21 July 1914.  The by-election was held due to the incumbent Irish Parliamentary MP, Richard Hazleton, who was seeking re-election.  It was retained by Hazleton who was unopposed.

References

1914 elections in Ireland
By-elections to the Parliament of the United Kingdom in County Galway constituencies
1914 elections in the United Kingdom
Unopposed by-elections to the Parliament of the United Kingdom (need citation)